Daniel Burgess may refer to:

Daniel Burgess (minister) (1645–1713), English Presbyterian divine
Daniel Burgess (chaplain), chaplain to Horace Vere and father-in-law to William Ames
Daniel Maynard Burgess (1828–1911), American surgeon and explorer
Dick Burgess (1896–1983), English soccer player
Daniel Wright "Danny" Burgess Jr., American Republican Party politician in Florida

See also
Daniel Burges